Maxime Blanc (born 23 January 1992) is a French professional footballer who plays as a midfielder for  club Villefranche.

Career
A product of the Lyon Academy, Blanc signed a three-year deal with Ligue 1 side Evian in July 2013. He made his senior debut, and only league appearance, for Evian in a 3–0 defeat to Nantes on 5 October 2013. In July 2014 he was given permission to trial with Ligue 2 side Arles-Avignon. He subsequently terminated his contract with Evian and signed with Arles-Avignon. He scores his first senior goal whilst with Arles-Avignon, on 1 May 2015, in a 2–0 win over Créteil.

After leaving Arles-Avignon at the end of the 2014–15 season, Blanc spent time with sixth-tier Espérance Pernoise before signing for Châteauroux in the summer of 2016. He stayed only a few months at Châteauroux, before agreeing an 18-month contract with Chambly.

In June 2017, Blanc signed with Villefranche, dropping a division to Championnat National 2.

On 22 June 2021, he signed with FBBP01.

On 17 June 2022, Blanc agreed to return to Villefranche.

References

1992 births
Living people
Sportspeople from Avignon
Association football midfielders
French footballers
Olympique Lyonnais players
Thonon Evian Grand Genève F.C. players
AC Arlésien players
LB Châteauroux players
FC Villefranche Beaujolais players
Football Bourg-en-Bresse Péronnas 01 players
Ligue 1 players
Ligue 2 players
Championnat National players
Championnat National 2 players
Championnat National 3 players